DJ Dick may refer to:
 Fabian Lenz, German DJ, Techno musician and events producer
 Richard Whittingham, British musician and founder of Rockers Hi-Fi